OT301 is a self-managed social centre in a legalized squat in the Dutch city of Amsterdam, located on Overtoom 301.

History
The former Dutch film academy was squatted in 1999 by a group of artists. After being a breeding ground for a number of years, the building was bought by the user association Eerste Hulp Bij Kunst (EHBK) from the council in 2006. It is used as a multi-media alternative cultural centre, comparable to projects in other Dutch cities such as Extrapool in Nijmegen and WORM in Rotterdam.

Activities

OT301 is a venue for music and films, a non-profit print shop, artists workspace and an 'organic cultural kitchen' (a vegan restaurant) called De Peper. Formerly, it housed the offices of European Youth For Action and Green Pepper magazine. OT301 received the Amsterdamprijs voor de Kunsten (Amsterdam Prize for the Arts) from the Amsterdam Fonds voor de Kunst on 23 August 2007 from Amsterdam Mayor Job Cohen.

References

External links
 OT301 website
 De Peper website

Legalized squats
Music venues in the Netherlands
Culture in Amsterdam
Squats in the Netherlands
Social centres in the Netherlands
Infoshops